2LM is an Australian radio station serving the Lismore region of New South Wales. It opened in September 1936.

History
2LM was founded by Richmond Rivers Broadcasters Ltd. and supplanted 2XN Lismore (founded 1930 and operated on 1340 kHz), which the company purchased and closed down.

References

Radio stations in New South Wales
Radio stations established in 1936
News and talk radio stations in Australia
Classic hits radio stations in Australia
Broadcast Operations Group

External links
Official web site
Official web site